Flávio Silveiro José de Carvalho (born 20 June 1981), known as just 'Flavinho, is a Brazilian football player who last played for Greek club Kerkyra F.C.

References

External links
 Player profile on AO Kerkyra official site

1981 births
Living people
Brazilian footballers
Brazilian expatriate footballers
Association football defenders
Associação Desportiva Cabofriense players
Americano Futebol Clube players
A.O. Kerkyra players
Super League Greece players
Expatriate footballers in Greece
Footballers from Rio de Janeiro (city)